Napoleon Iłłakowicz (born 2 December 1811; died 7 November 1861 in Vilnius) was a Polish painter, and decorator.

He completed his secondary education, where he participated in drawing with Maciej Przybylski. From 1830, he studied painting at the Vilnius University in Jan Rustem's art workshops. He took part in the November Uprising. Due to the failure of the uprising, he emigrated to France, where between the years of 1833 to 1836, he continued his studies. He also studied in Zaragoza. He worked in London, at the court of Queen Victoria, in Italy, as well as Spain, and other countries. In 1848, he moved to live in Lwów, in 1857 to Vilnius, where he lived until his death.

References

External links

1811 births
1861 deaths
19th-century Polish painters
19th-century Polish male artists
Polish male painters